A syphilid is any of the cutaneous and mucous membrane lesions characteristic of secondary and tertiary syphilis.

It appears about 10 weeks after infection. Patient may present with prodromal symptoms such as fever, acratia, myalgia arthralgia, headache, anorexia. Its eruption pattern is macular, papular,  follicular papules, or pustule, symmetrical, generalized and dense, round or oval in shape, and is red copper in color.

See also 
 Id reactions
 List of cutaneous conditions

References 

Bacterium-related cutaneous conditions
Syphilis